During the 2002–03 season, FC Barcelona competed in La Liga, the Copa del Rey, and the UEFA Champions League. The club's top scorer was Patrick Kluivert, with 21 goals.

Season summary
The 2002–03 season was the final year of president Joan Gaspart's reign. It was also his least successful at Barcelona, with the club changing manager three times during the course of the season, disrupting the league campaign. The club eventually finished in sixth place in La Liga, which was Barça's worst position in 15 years. In the Copa del Rey, the side failed to get past the round of 32. In Europe, however, they fared slightly better, reaching the quarter-finals of the UEFA Champions League and setting a competition record for the most consecutive wins, with 11. Overall, the team's form was poor all season, which spurred wholesale changes in management, the board and squad of players.

Squad
Squad at end of season

Transfers

In

Total spending:   €15,500,000

Out

Total income:   €15,150,000
{|

Competitions

Pre-season and friendlies

La Liga

League table

Results by round

Matches

Copa del Rey

Round of 64

UEFA Champions League

Third qualifying round

First group stage

Group H

Second group stage

Group A

Quarter-finals

Statistics

Players statistics

Top scorers

See also
FC Barcelona
2002–03 UEFA Champions League
2002–03 La Liga

References

External links
 
 FCBarcelonaweb.co.uk English Speaking FC Barcelona Supporters
 ESPNsoccernet: Barcelona Team Page 
 FC Barcelona (Spain) profile
 uefa.com - UEFA Champions League 
 Web Oficial de la Liga de Fútbol Profesional
 
 

FC Barcelona seasons
Barcelona